Matsuura is a Japanese surname.

Matsuura may also refer to:

Places
Matsuura, Nagasaki, a city in Japan
Matsuura River, a 46 km river in Saga Prefecture, Japan
Mount Midori, also known as Mount Matsuura, a mountain located in the Daisetsuzan Volcanic Group of the Ishikari Mountains, Hokkaidō, Japan

Other uses
Matsuura Machinery, an international heavy machinery manufacturing company in Fukui, Fukui Prefecture, Japan
Matsuura Railway, a railway company in Nagasaki and Saga Prefecture in Japan
18903 Matsuura, a main-belt asteroid